The Pâncota oil field is an oil field located in Pâncota, Arad County. It was discovered in 2012 and developed by Universal Premium. It will begin production in 2014 and will produce oil.

References

Oil fields in Romania